Abbas Saeed Ali Mansoor Ayyad (born 11 May 1987) is a footballer from Bahrain. He currently plays for the Bahraini football club Al-Ahli, and has played in the Bahrain national football team.

External links 
 

Bahraini footballers
Bahrain international footballers
1987 births
Living people
2011 AFC Asian Cup players
Footballers at the 2006 Asian Games
Association football defenders
Asian Games competitors for Bahrain